Helicopter Maritime Strike Seven Four (HSM-74), the "Swamp Foxes", is a United States Navy helicopter squadron based at Naval Air Station Jacksonville, Jacksonville, Florida.  HSM-74 is attached to Carrier Air Wing Three and deploys aboard cruisers, destroyers, frigates, and aircraft carriers in support of a carrier strike group. It was established on 21 August 1986 as Helicopter Antisubmarine Squadron (Light) Forty Four (HSL-44)

Mission

The squadron employs the MH-60R multi-mission helicopter.  Primary missions include Anti-Submarine Warfare (ASW), Anti-Surface Warfare (SUW), Command, Control, Communications (CCC), Command and Control Warfare (C2W), Mobility (MOB), and Non-Combat Operations (NCO).  Secondary missions consist of Search and Rescue (SAR), Medical Evacuation (MEDEVAC), Vertical Replenishment (VERTREP), Naval Surface Fire Support (NSFS), and Communications Relay (COMREL).

Transition from HSL-44

HSL-44 was redesignated HSM-74 on 9 June 2011 at Naval Air Station Jacksonville.  The change reflected their transition from employing the SH-60B to the MH-60R, as well a from a detachment-based, expeditionary squadron to its realignment in support of a carrier air wing.  As part of this transition, then-HSL-44 relocated to NAS Jacksonville from their previous home of Naval Station Mayport in November 2009.

General Information

HSM-74 operates twelve MH-60R helicopters in four combat elements. These combat elements (or CELs) consist of the carrier element and Detachments 1, 2, and 3. The carrier element deploys and maintains five helicopters while the detachments maintain two each. Each CEL can work independently of every other CEL.

See also 
 History of the United States Navy
 US Navy Helicopter Squadrons
 MH-60R

References

External links 
 HSM-74 Official Website

Helicopter maritime strike squadrons of the United States Navy
Military units and formations in Florida